Huang Hui is a Chinese architect. Huang lives and works in Beijing, China.

Education 
Huang graduated from Tsinghua University in 1961 with a degree in architecture.

Career 
Huang has been the recipient of the prize for Excellent Design from the Ministry of Housing and Urban-Rural Development and the Ministry of Environmental Protection of the People's Republic of China for her design of Beijing High School No.4.

Further reading
Works by Hui Huang
"Duizuo." Lunheng jiaoshi. Annotated by Huang Hui. Taipei: Taiwan shangwu yinshuguan, 1983.
with Guan, Changcun & Shi, Jian. "Rehabilitation in Xiaohoucang Area". Beijing City Planning and Construction Review. 1989, No.2, pp. 21–23 (in Chinese).

Works about Hui Huang
Women of China. Beijing: Foreign Language Press, 1987. pp. 2.

References

Chinese architects
Tsinghua University alumni
Chinese women architects
Living people
Year of birth missing (living people)